Hays is a city in Hays County, Texas, United States. The population was 217 at the 2010 census.

Geography

Demographics

As of the census of 2000, there were 233 people, 88 households, and 73 families residing in the city. The population density was 1,346.1 people per square mile (529.2/km2). There were 88 housing units at an average density of 508.4/sq mi (199.9/km2). The racial makeup of the city was 91.42% White, 1.72% African American, 0.43% Asian, 6.01% from other races, and 0.43% from two or more races. Hispanic or Latino of any race were 8.15% of the population.

There were 88 households, out of which 30.7% had children under the age of 18 living with them, 62.5% were married couples living together, 14.8% had a female householder with no husband present, and 17.0% were non-families. 12.5% of all households were made up of individuals, and 3.4% had someone living alone who was 65 years of age or older. The average household size was 2.65 and the average family size was 2.79.

In the city, the population was spread out, with 19.7% under the age of 18, 7.3% from 18 to 24, 24.0% from 25 to 44, 37.3% from 45 to 64, and 11.6% who were 65 years of age or older. The median age was 44 years. For every 100 females, there were 89.4 males. For every 100 females age 18 and over, there were 94.8 males.

The median income for a household in the city was $51,250, and the median income for a family was $53,542. Males had a median income of $40,313 versus $33,333 for females. The per capita income for the city was $25,234. None of the families and 2.7% of the population were living below the poverty line, including no under eighteens and 13.6% of those over 64.

History 
The city of Hays was founded in the 1970s following a movement to incorporate the Country Estates subdivision.

Education
The city is served by the Hays Consolidated Independent School District.

References

External links
City of Hays official website

Cities in Texas
Cities in Hays County, Texas
Cities in Greater Austin
Populated places established in the 1970s